Tariq Spezie Sevilla (born 21 June 1980), known simply as Tariq, is a Spanish former professional footballer who played as a striker.

He played 87 games and scored 21 goals in Segunda División for Granada and Huesca, but spent the vast majority of his career in Segunda División B, where he recorded figures of 407 matches and 111 goals in service of 11 teams.

Early years
Tariq was born in Sharjah, United Arab Emirates to an Italian father and a Spanish mother, receiving his name from his father – who was working in the country – in honour of Tariq ibn Ziyad. As the political situation in the region worsened, eventually leading to the Iran–Iraq War, the family relocated to Italy with their one-year infant,<ref name="ARAB">[http://www.publico.es/deportes/192786/el-arabe-de-segunda-b El árabe de Segunda B (Segunda B'''s Arab)]; Público, 21 January 2009 (in Spanish)</ref> and later to Spain.

Career
Tariq played youth football in modest clubs in Catalonia, making his senior debuts with Real Valladolid B and competing one season in Segunda División B and one in Tercera División with the club. Another reserve team followed in the 2001–02 campaign, as he helped RCD Espanyol B finish second in the third level, without no playoff promotion however.

Tariq spent the following eight-and-a-half years in division three in representation of as seven teams, mainly Águilas CF. In the 2008–09 season he scored a career-best 24 goals – best in the division– for UD Puertollano,Mi fútbol modesto: Tariq, el goleador del Puertollano, también le marca a la pobreza (My modest football: Tariq, Puertollano's goal-getter, also scores against poverty) ; Notas de Fútbol, 18 November 2008 (in Spanish) adding 19 for Granada CF in the following year, en route'' to his first Segunda División promotion.

On 25 January 2011, Tariq was loaned to SD Huesca – also in the second division – until the end of the season, via Udinese Calcio. In less than half of the matches, he scored eight goals (second-best in the squad behind Juanjo Camacho) as the Aragonese finally retained their league status; he moved on a permanent basis ahead of the following campaign.

Tariq left Huesca, then in the third division, for fellow league side Huracán Valencia CF on 2 July 2014. Following his team's disqualification for financial issues, he dropped down a league to sign for neighbouring CD Castellón on 18 January 2016.

Honours
Segunda División B: Top Scorer 2008–09

References

External links

1980 births
Living people
People from the Emirate of Sharjah
Spanish people of Italian descent
Spanish footballers
Association football forwards
Segunda División players
Segunda División B players
Tercera División players
Real Valladolid Promesas players
RCD Espanyol B footballers
CP Cacereño players
CD Linares players
CF Palencia footballers
CE Sabadell FC footballers
Águilas CF players
CD Puertollano footballers
Granada CF footballers
SD Huesca footballers
Huracán Valencia CF players
CD Castellón footballers
Spanish expatriate sportspeople in the United Arab Emirates